Henry Misselbrook (16 December 1832 – 11 July 1895) was an English first-class cricketer who represented Hampshire in one first-class match in 1869 against the Marylebone Cricket Club. Misselbrook took 4 wickets for 18 runs in the Marylebone Cricket Club's first innings, before claiming a further 2 wickets in the Marylebone Cricket Club's second innings.

Misselbrook died in Winchester, Hampshire on 11 July 1895.

External links
Henry Misselbrook at Cricinfo
Henry Misselbrook at CricketArchive

1832 births
1895 deaths
People from the City of Winchester
English cricketers
Hampshire cricketers